Monochoria was originally a genus of aquatic plants in the water hyacinth family, Pontederiaceae. Currently, it has been reduced to a subgenus of Pontederia, Pontederia subg. Monochoria, represented by ten species (listed below). Its species are native to tropical and subtropical Africa, Asia, and Oceania. They live in the water or in wet soils. They produce leaves on long petioles and some are cultivated for their attractive flowers.

Species
Pontederia africana (Solms) M.Pell. & C.N.Horn
Pontederia australasica (Ridl.) M.Pell. & C.N.Horn
Pontederia brevipetiolata (Verdc.) M.Pell. & C.N.Horn
Pontederia cyanea (F.Muell.) M.Pell. & C.N.Horn
Pontederia elata (Ridl.) M.Pell. & C.N.Horn
Pontederia hastata L.
Pontederia korsakowii (Regel & Maack) M.Pell. & C.N.Horn
Pontederia plantaginea Roxb.
Pontederia vaginalis Burm. f.
Pontederia valida (G.X.Wang & Nagam.) M.Pell. & C.N.Horn

References

External links

Pontederiaceae
Commelinales genera